Troye Sivan Live is the debut concert tour by Australian recording artist Troye Sivan. The tour supports his fourth EP, Wild, and debut studio album, Blue Neighbourhood. The tour started in October 2015 in North America and continued in Europe in November 2015 and Australia in January 2016.

Background
Following the release of the EP, Sivan tweeted that he planned to do live shows in October 2015. The following day, during an interview with SugarScape, the singer stated that he planned to visit the UK and Australia before the end of the year. Within the coming weeks, Sivan posted pictures to his Instagram account of rehearsals. The tour was officially announced on 25 September 2015, via Sivan's official Twitter account. The announcement came alongside the release of the video for "Fools". The news of the tour and video helped the singer claim the top spot on Billboard's "Twitter Trending 140" chart. Hours later, it was revealed that the tour sold out within 30 minutes.

Commenting on his first live performances, Sivan stated:
I haven't performed since I was 16 or something like that. It's such a different ball game now though—these are my songs and my vision come to life. I am really excited about it. I think it's going to be a connection unlike any I have experienced before. I am definitely going to cry. If people sing back lyrics to me, I am done.

Sivan's debut album Blue Neighbourhood came out four days after the conclusion of the tour, which means the songs "Suburbia", "Cool", and "Youth" were still unreleased at the time Sivan was performing them on tour. While Sivan was in Paris on 23 November for one of his last shows, he announced the Blue Neighbourhood Tour that will set off in 2016.

Opening acts
DJ100Proof 
Mountain of Youth 
LANY 
DJ ABD 
DJ Lani Love 
DJ Shea Van Horn  
DJ Sparber 
Tkay Maidza 
DJ Tyde Levi 
Gordi

Setlist
"Bite" 
"Fools"
"Cool"
"DKLA"
"Ease"
"Talk Me Down" 
"Suburbia"
"Wild"
"Happy Little Pill"
"Youth"

Tour dates

Festivals and other miscellaneous performances
This concert was co-headlined with LANY

Cancelled shows

External links
Troye Sivan Official Website

References

2015 concert tours
Troye Sivan concert tours